Marleyia is a genus of planthoppers in the subfamily Ricaniinae, erected by William Lucas Distant in 1909.

Species
Fulgoromorpha Lists on the Web includes:
 Marleyia albomaculata Distant, 1909
 Marleyia brunnescens Distant, 1909 - type species

References

External links
 

Ricaniidae